Anderson Tanoto is a member of the Board of Trustees at Tanoto Foundation, a philanthropic organization involved in poverty alleviation through education, "empowerment" and "the enhancement of the quality of lives". Tanoto is the youngest son of businessman and philanthropist Sukanto Tanoto. He received his education from University of Pennsylvania, Wharton School, where he graduated with a Bachelor of Science in Economics. In October 2017, he was named to The Wharton School's "40 Under 40" list, which seeks to recognise impressive young Wharton alumni. Tanoto also sits on the Wharton Executive Board of Asia.

Career 

After graduation, Tanoto became a consultant at Bain & Company focusing in consumer products and financial services. While at Bain, he acquired expertise within Southeast Asia, working with clients in Malaysia, Thailand and Indonesia.

Tanoto joined Royal Golden Eagle (RGE) in March 2013 and currently serves as managing director. Founded by his father, Sukanto Tanoto, RGE manages a group of resource-based manufacturing companies operating in Indonesia, China, Brazil, Canada and Europe, with over US$18 billion in assets and a workforce of 60,000 people. He spends most of his time leading RGE-managed APRIL's operations located in Pangkalan Kerinci, Riau, Indonesia. He is also involved in the company's business transformation and received praise for his approach to growing the business efficiently and personally emphasizing the company's commitment to sustainability.

At COP 21 on Dec 1, 2015, Tanoto announced APRIL's US$100 million investment in an expanded eco-restoration project in Riau, spanning 150,000 hectares. He also provides strategic direction on the Riau Ecosystem Restoration project in Kampar, Sumatra, Indonesia.

Further to this, Tanoto was involved in developing the Fire-Free Village Programme, which launched July 2015 and involved cultivating and incentivizing villages in Riau to adopt fire prevention practices. The Programme helped drive a significant reduction in fires in participating villages, and was later scaled from 9 to 20 villages in 2016. At the Responsible Business Forum in Jakarta in February 2017, Tanoto was a panelist as the Fire Free Alliance—an industry group comprising members APRIL, Asian Agri, IDH, Musim Mas, PM.Haze, and Wilmar—marked its first anniversary in contributing solutions to Indonesia’s persistent fire and haze problems with a focus on fire prevention through community engagement.

On May 2, 2018, Tanoto was appointed Chairman of the Brazil Committee under the Indonesian Chamber of Commerce and Industry (Kadin). The committee was set up to boost trade relations between Indonesia and Brazil.

Philanthropy 

Apart from his business interests, Tanoto also works in community development and philanthropy, which was sparked in his youth when his parents frequently brought him and his siblings to Indonesian fields and plantations. His experiences spending several summers in Kerinci, Riau, would influence his future contributions to community building and sustainable development. He is actively involved in the Tanoto Foundation, a non-profit charitable organization founded in 1981 by the Tanoto family to reduce poverty through education, empowerment and enhancement. As a member of the Board of Trustees of Tanoto Foundation, Tanoto drives various foundation initiatives focusing on Indonesia's next generation.

He initiated a seed funding program for Tanoto Foundation scholars to promote entrepreneurship, and actively participates in the Tanoto Entrepreneurship Series (TES) where prominent speakers such as Jusuf Kalla and then-Jakarta governor Joko Widodo have spoken to the students and scholars of Tanoto Foundation. He believes that entrepreneurship plays a crucial role in forming a dynamic emerging economy.

References

Living people
Wharton School of the University of Pennsylvania alumni
Indonesian people of Chinese descent
Year of birth missing (living people)
Place of birth missing (living people)
Michelin Pilot Challenge drivers